is a puzzle game developed by WOW Entertainment for the Game Boy Advance. It is part of the Columns series and was released in Europe on December 7, 2001, in Japan on December 13, 2001, and in North America on February 4, 2002. The game was later re-released twice as part of the 2 Games in 1 twin-pack cartridge in Europe, first bundled with Sonic Pinball Party on November 11, 2005 and then with ChuChu Rocket! on November 28, 2008. The latter compilation, aside as being the final one released on the system in Europe, was the final game to be released on the Game Boy Advance.

The gameplay features falling vertical blocks of three coloured gems, with matching gems being destroyed. There is a basic plot of rescuing the stolen kingdom's crown by winning games.

There is a power-up feature, with different potential attack and defence features being possible to use, with most only being available during player-to-player versus games.

Reception

IGN gave a negative review to Columns Crown, saying that while the versus mode was enjoyable with use of the power-ups, the game as a whole was much less addictive than other similar games released on the Game Boy Advance.

References

External links
 Columns Crown on Mobygames

2001 video games
Game Boy Advance games
Game Boy Advance-only games
Puzzle video games
Sega video games
THQ games
Video games developed in Japan